This is a list of awards and nominations received by Wiz Khalifa.

Awards and nominations

Notes

References

External links
 

Khalifa, Wiz